Jane Jennings was an American actress known for playing older motherly characters.
In a 1918 edition of Motion Picture News she is described as a sweet looking little woman. Famous Players was one of the studios where she worked. She is on the cover of the sheet music for That Wonderful Mother of Mine (1918). By the 1925 film Self Defense, she had played 178 mother roles in films.

Filmography 

 I Want to Forget (1918)
 The Girl Who Came Back (1918)
 I Love You Just the Same, Sweet Adeline (1919)
 The Woman Under Oath (1919)
 As a Man Thinks (1919)
 The Climbers (1919) as Aunt Ruth
 The Lion and the Mouse (1919) as Mrs. Ryder
 The Cost (1920)
 His House in Order (1920)
 The Gilded Lily (1921)
 What Women Will Do (1921) as Mrs. Wade
 The Case of Becky (1921) as Mrs. Arnold
 The Inner Chamber (1921) as Mrs. Robson
 What's Your Reputation Worth? (1921) as Mrs. Pettus
 The Heart of Maryland (1921) as Mrs. Claiborne
 Haldane of the Secret Service (1923)
 Broadway Rose (1922) as Mrs. Lawrence
 A Pasteboard Crown (1922) as Mrs. Lawton
 The Challenge (1922) as Mrs. Hastings
 The Darling of the Rich (1922) as Jane Winship
 The Go-Getter (1923)
 Trouping with Ellen (1924) as Tony's Mother
 A Man Must Live (1925) as Mrs. Ross-Fayne
 The Little French Girl (1925)
 Self Defense (1925)
 Enemies of Youth (1925)
 False Pride (1925)
 The Romance of a Million Dollars (1926)
 Broken Homes (1926)
 The Virgin Wife (1926) as Virginia Jamieson
 The Song and Dance Man (1926) as Ma Carroll
 Burnt Fingers (1927) as Mrs. Cabell
 Faithless Lover (1928) as Mrs. Seeton

References

External links 

 

American silent film actresses
Year of birth missing
Year of death missing
20th-century American actresses